is a Japanese manga series written by Hajime Inoryu and illustrated by Shota Ito. It was serialized in Kodansha's Weekly Young Magazine from May 2018 to August 2019, when it moved to the Comic Days manga website, where the series finished its serialization in September 2020. The series' individual chapters were collected into eleven volumes. A television drama adaptation aired on Fuji TV from October to November 2022.

Media

Manga
Written by Hajime Inoryu and illustrated by Shota Ito, the series began serialization in Weekly Young Magazine on May 7, 2018. In August 2019, the series moved to the Comic Days manga website, where it completed its serialization on September 7, 2020. Kodansha collected the series' individual chapters into eleven volumes.

In November 2020, Kodansha USA announced that they licensed the series for English publication.

Volume list

TV drama
A television drama adaptation was announced on June 26, 2022. It is set to be chief directed by Hiroaki Matsuyama, with Michitaka Okuda writing the scripts and Daisuke Kusagaya producing; Ryosuke Yamada is set to perform the lead. It aired on Fuji TV from October 5, 2022, to November 30, 2022.

Reception
The columnists for Manga News praised the story, artwork, and characters. Faustine Lillaz from Planete BD praised the suspense elements in the story and the artwork. Christel Scheja from Splash Comics also praised the story, calling it unique.

The series has 1.2 million copies in circulation.

References

External links
  
 

Drama anime and manga
Fuji TV dramas
Japanese webcomics
Kodansha manga
Manga adapted into television series
Seinen manga
Suspense anime and manga
Webcomics in print